Edward River, or Kyalite River, an anabranch of the Murray River and part of the Murray–Darling basin, is located in the western Riverina region of south-western New South Wales, Australia.

The river rises at Picnic Point east of Mathoura, as a result of the bottleneck created in the Murray by the Cadell Fault, and flows generally north through river red gum forest, reaching Deniliquin and then flowing generally west through Moulamein. It is joined by six minor tributaries, before reaching its confluence with the Wakool River and re-entering the Murray at Wakool Junction, near Kyalite. The river descends  over its  course.

See also

List of rivers of New South Wales
List of rivers of Australia

References

External links

 

Rivers of New South Wales
Rivers in the Riverina
Murray-Darling basin